Anti-Social Limited is a Canadian documentary film, directed by Rosvita Dransfeld and released in 2014. A sequel to her 2009 film Broke, the film updates the story of ex-convict Chris Hoard as he endeavours to set up his own construction business despite having been diagnosed with antisocial personality disorder.

The film was a nominee for the Donald Brittain Award at the 4th Canadian Screen Awards in 2016.

References

External links

2014 films
2014 documentary films
Canadian documentary television films
Films shot in Edmonton
2010s English-language films
2010s Canadian films